Anders Bükk (born 17 October 1963) is a Swedish wrestler. He competed in the men's Greco-Roman 52 kg at the 1984 Summer Olympics.

References

1963 births
Living people
Swedish male sport wrestlers
Olympic wrestlers of Sweden
Wrestlers at the 1984 Summer Olympics
Sportspeople from Gothenburg